Austria took part at the Eurovision Song Contest 1993 in Millstreet, Ireland, represented by Tony Wegas with the song "Maria Magdalena".

Before Eurovision

Internal selection 
Österreichischer Rundfunk (ORF) selected Tony Wegas, who had represented Austria in 1992, to represent the country at the 1993 Contest in Ireland.

National final 
A national final was held to select the competing song for Austria at Eurovision, with seven songs, all sung by Wegas, presented. In February 1993 the seven songs were played on the radio, with the public invited to vote for their favourite entry by postcard voting. On 30 March 1993, a television programme, held at the ORF TV studios in Vienna and hosted by Andreas Steppan and Michael Niavarani, was shown by ORF with pre-recorded videos of the seven entries, afterwards the results of the voting were announced. 15,245 postcards were received by ORF for the contest with the winning song, "Maria Magdalena", receiving 6,170 postcards in total.

At Eurovision
Wegas performed 10th on the night of the contest, following Iceland and preceding Portugal. At the close of the voting the song had received 32 points, placing 14th in a field of 25.

Voting

References

External links
Austrian National Final 1993

1993
Countries in the Eurovision Song Contest 1993
Eurovision